Stoop may refer to:

 Stoop (surname)
 Stoop (architecture), a small staircase leading to the entrance of a building
 Partial squatting, but with unhealthy bending at the waist and little or no bending of the knees.
 the high-speed attack dive of a bird of prey (most usually a hawk, eagle, falcon or owl)
 Twickenham Stoop, also known simply as "The Stoop", a rugby stadium in London named after Adrian Stoop
 The Stoop (album), a music album by Little Jackie
 Stevenage Outer Orbital Path (STOOP)

See also
 Stoops (disambiguation)
 Stoup
 Stoupe the Enemy of Mankind, a hip-hop DJ and member of Jedi Mind Tricks